Grand'Anse Praslin is an administrative district of Seychelles located mostly on the island of Praslin, but also administers Cousin Island, Cousine Island, Booby Island, and Aride Island.

References

 
Districts of Seychelles
Praslin, Seychelles